Nepenthes merrilliana (after Elmer Drew Merrill) is a tropical pitcher plant endemic to the Philippines.  It produces some of the largest pitchers in the genus, rivalling those of N. rajah.

The species is native to northern and central Mindanao as well as neighbouring Dinagat and Samar. Its presence in southern Mindanao is uncertain. It inhabits coastal forest areas on steep slopes at elevations of 0–1100 m above sea level.

Nepenthes surigaoensis is closely related to N. merrilliana and was for a long time considered a heterotypic synonym of this species. Nepenthes samar is another closely allied species.

Natural hybrids
N. alata × N. merrilliana [=N. × merrilliata]
? (N. alata × N. merrilliana) × N. mirabilis [=N. × tsangoya]
N. bellii × N. merrilliana
N. merrilliana × N. mindanaoensis
N. merrilliana × N. mirabilis

References

Further reading

 Bauer, U., C.J. Clemente, T. Renner & W. Federle 2012. Form follows function: morphological diversification and alternative trapping strategies in carnivorous Nepenthes pitcher plants. Journal of Evolutionary Biology 25(1): 90–102. 
 Beveridge, N.G.P., C. Rauch, P.J.A. Keßler, R.R. van Vugt & P.C. van Welzen 2013. A new way to identify living species of Nepenthes (Nepenthaceae): more data needed! Carnivorous Plant Newsletter 42(4): 122–128.
 Cantley, R. 2000. Nepenthes of the Philippines. [video] The 3rd Conference of the International Carnivorous Plant Society, San Francisco, USA.
 Cheek, M. & M. Jebb 2013. Nepenthes ramos (Nepenthaceae), a new species from Mindanao, Philippines. Willdenowia 43(1): 107–111. 
 Co, L. & W. Suarez 2012. Nepenthaceae. Co's Digital Flora of the Philippines.
  Gronemeyer, T. 2008. Nepenthes auf den Philippinen – Ein Reisebericht. Das Taublatt 60(1): 15–27.
  Gronemeyer, T. & V. Heinrich 2008. Wiederentdeckung von Nepenthes surigaoensis am Naturstandort auf den Philippinen. Das Taublatt 60(1): 28–33.
 Kurata, S. & M. Toyoshima 1972. Philippine species of Nepenthes. The Gardens' Bulletin Singapore 26(1): 155–158. Abstract
 Macfarlane, J.M. 1927. The Philippine species of Nepenthes. The Philippine Journal of Science 33(2): 127–140.
  Mansur, M. 2001.  In: Prosiding Seminar Hari Cinta Puspa dan Satwa Nasional. Lembaga Ilmu Pengetahuan Indonesia, Bogor. pp. 244–253.
  McPherson, S. & T. Gronemeyer 2008. Die Nepenthesarten der Philippinen Eine Fotodokumentation. Das Taublatt 60(1): 34–78.
 Meimberg, H., A. Wistuba, P. Dittrich & G. Heubl 2001. Molecular phylogeny of Nepenthaceae based on cladistic analysis of plastid trnK intron sequence data. Plant Biology 3(2): 164–175. 
  Meimberg, H. 2002.  Ph.D. thesis, Ludwig Maximilian University of Munich, Munich.
 Meimberg, H. & G. Heubl 2006. Introduction of a nuclear marker for phylogenetic analysis of Nepenthaceae. Plant Biology 8(6): 831–840. 
  Oikawa, T. 1992. Nepenthes merrilliana Macf.. In: . [The Grief Vanishing.] Parco Co., Japan. pp. 58–59.

Carnivorous plants of Asia
merrilliana
Endemic flora of the Philippines
Flora of Mindanao
Flora of the Visayas
Plants described in 1911
Vulnerable flora of Asia